Claus Lauritz Clausen (November 3, 1820 – February 20, 1892) was an American  pioneer Lutheran minister, church leader, military chaplain and politician.

Biography
Claus Clausen was born at Borgnæs in Tranderup Parish, on the island of Ærø, in Svendborg County, Denmark. Clausen was a lay minister in Drammen, Norway prior to immigrating to America in 1842. Ordained in 1843, he organized the first Norwegian Lutheran congregation that came out of the state-church tradition within the Muskego Settlement. Clausen also organized and served as pastor of several nearby churches including Heart Prairie Lutheran Church. Clausen accepted a call during 1846 from Norwegian-settlers in the Jefferson Prairie Settlement. Clausen relocated from the Muskego Settlement and made Rock County, Wisconsin the center for his activities among the settlements in southern Wisconsin and northern Illinois, remaining until 1853.

Starting in 1850, Clausen was editor of the Norwegian language newspapers, Maanedstidende and Kirketidende as well as the successor newspaper Emigranten, all published in Inmansville in Rock County. These Norwegian Lutheran endeavors at publishing mark the existence of the first print-shop in Rock County. From 1853 until 1861, he was founding pastor of First Lutheran Church of St. Ansgar in Saint Ansgar, Iowa.

During 1853, Clausen was one of three pastors who organized the Synod of the Norwegian Evangelical Lutheran Church in America commonly known as the Norwegian Synod. Clausen was one of the leading members of a Synod committee appointed to supervise the creation of Luther College during 1857.

Clausen was elected to the Iowa General Assembly during 1856–1859, serving in the Iowa House of Representatives. At the outbreak of the American Civil War, he would serve as army chaplain from 1861–62 under the command of Colonel Hans C. Heg within the 15th Wisconsin Volunteer Regiment, more popularly known as the "Scandinavian Regiment".

Clausen served as the Iowa Commissioner to the Paris Exposition Universelle (1867). In 1868 he resigned from the Synod of the Norwegian Evangelical Lutheran Church in America and helped organize the Conference of the Norwegian-Danish Evangelical Lutheran Church of America becoming its first president from 1870 until 1872.

See also
Norway Lutheran Church

References

Further reading
Jensson, J.C. American Lutheran Biographies; Historical notices of over 350 leading men of the American Lutheran Church  (Milwaukee, Wis: Houtkamp. 1890)
Jorgensen, Margreth, Claus L. Clausen, Pioneer Pastor and Settlement Promoter, 1848-1868.  (Minneapolis, MN: University of Minnesota. Minnesota Historical Society. 1930)
Norlie, Olaf Morgan, Prominent Personalities (Northfield, MN: National Lutheran Council.  1942)
Swansen, H. Fred. The Founder of St. Ansgar: the Life Story of Claus Laurits Clausen (Blair, Nebraska: Lutheran Publishing House. 1949)
Pastor Claus Laurits Clausen: Banebryder for den Norske og Danske Kirke i Amerika. Første skandinavisk Feltpræst Kirkehistorisk Bidrag. 1921. Rasmus Andersen

External links
 
The Norwegian Lutheran Church on Norway Hill
Norwegian-American Historical Association – The Promise of America

1820 births
1892 deaths
Members of the Iowa House of Representatives
People from Clinton, Rock County, Wisconsin
19th-century American Lutheran clergy
Danish emigrants to the United States
Union Army chaplains
University and college founders
Place of death missing
19th-century American politicians
People from Norway, Wisconsin
People from Ærø Municipality